The Nokia Asha 200 (Dual Sim Phone) & Nokia Asha 201 (Single Sim Phone) are budget-level additions to the Nokia Asha family released in Q4 2011. Both devices run the Nokia S40 mobile operating system. There is no direct predecessor of the phones, though the closest to it is the Nokia X2-01, which has similar features and a very similar user interface, as well as having better music capabilities. The Nokia C3 is also an indirect predecessor, also using similar features, though the C3 is a higher end device. The phones are successors to the Nokia X1-01, as they use the same bright colors and the same Dual SIM support for Nokia Asha 200.

Colors
There were four main colors introduced to this phone, namely, pink, blue, black and white.  In addition, other colors introduced for selected regions were graphite, green, aqua, pearl white, light pink & orange. The device has uni-colored body rather than combination.

Camera 

The device is able to capture pictures at a resolution of 1600 x 1200 
pixels with its 2.0-megapixel camera. The results are good for day to 
day usage like instant sharing or updating profiles at social networks 
as the phone supports apps like Facebook and Twitter.
 
Features: 
 Landscape orientation
 Auto and Manual White Balance settings
 Active toolbar
 Still image Editor
 Full-screen viewfinder
 Self-timer
 15 fps frame rate for video playback

White balance video recording modes:
 Fluorescent
 Incandescent
 Automatic
 Daylight
 Brightness with intense glow

Browsing 
Enabled with the EDGE/EGPRS (2G) & GSM (2G) support, Nokia 200/201 is embedded with Nokia's Series 40 browser with supported technologies of Javascript 1.8, XHTML, WAP 2.0, HTML 4.0 (XHTML 1.1). Available email solutions for device are: Hotmail, Yahoo! Mail, Nokia Email & Gmail, following IM (Instant Messaging) services like Google Talk, Facebook chat, MySpace, Windows Live Messenger & Nokia Chat.

Software & Applications 
The phone's interface is based on Nokia's Series 40 interface featuring java games and applications. Device has embedded utilities like Dictionary, Digital clock, Recorder, Calculator, Clock, Calendar, Phonebook, Converter, Fixed Dialing Number, Notes, Alarm clock, Reminders, To-do list.

References

Device Overview: http://www.nokia.com/in-en/phones/phone/nokia-asha-200/
Detailed Information: http://www.nokia.com/in-en/phones/phone/nokia-asha-200/specifications/
Specs Nokia Asha 200: http://www.gsmarena.com/nokia_asha_200-4281.php
Specs Nokia Asha 201: http://www.gsmarena.com/nokia_asha_201-4280.php

Asha 200